Julius August Schmahl (August 1, 1867 – April 10, 1955) was a Minnesota politician, and a member of the Republican Party. He served nearly four decades in statewide elective office, as Minnesota's Secretary of State and Treasurer. He was a newspaper reporter and was the editor of the Redwood Falls Gazette newspaper.

Biography
Julius A. Schmahl was born in Traverse de Sioux, Nicollet County, Minnesota on August 1, 1867.

A newspaper editor and publisher, Schmahl was first elected to statewide office in 1906, winning election as Secretary of State. He would serve twelve years, stepping down in 1921. Schmahl later ran for State Treasurer in 1926. He would hold the position for all but two years between 1927 and 1951.

He married Elizabeth T. Dunnington in February 1895. His daughter Julie was married to Arizona businessman and political candidate Fred Trump. 

Schmahl retired from politics in 1951. He died in Saint Paul, Minnesota on April 10, 1955, at the age of 87.

References

Secretaries of State of Minnesota
State treasurers of Minnesota
Minnesota Republicans
1867 births
1955 deaths
People from Nicollet County, Minnesota
Editors of Minnesota newspapers